Logan Geariety Bearden (born November 3, 1995) is an American professional stock car racing driver. He competes part-time in the NASCAR Craftsman Truck Series, driving the No. 22 Ford F-150 for AM Racing.

Racing career
After growing up helping his father at local short tracks in Texas, Bearden began in kart racing. In 2007, he won the Oklahoma National Series championship and started competing in the World Karting Association's Manufacturers Cup. He eventually switched to pro modifieds, winning a rookie of the year award in 2013.

Bearden later moved to late models, with his first start in the SPEARS Southwest Tour Series coming at the Las Vegas Motor Speedway Bullring in 2017. In 2018, he entered the CARS Super Late Model Tour race at Fairgrounds Speedway, where he finished 12th. Bearden has also competed in the Snowball Derby.

After skipping 2020, Bearden returned to racing in the SPEARS Southwest Tour Series in 2021. In May, he joined Niece Motorsports for his NASCAR Camping World Truck Series debut at Circuit of the Americas. However, he was one of seven drivers who failed to qualify for the race.

A year later, he drove for AM Racing in the 2022 XPEL 225 in which he finally managed to qualify.

Personal life
Bearden was diagnosed with dyslexia in second grade.

Motorsports career results

NASCAR
(key) (Bold – Pole position awarded by qualifying time. Italics – Pole position earned by points standings or practice time. * – Most laps led.)

Craftsman Truck Series

 Season still in progress
 Ineligible for series points

References

External links
 
 

Living people
1995 births
NASCAR drivers
CARS Tour drivers
People from Leander, Texas
Sportspeople with dyslexia
Racing drivers from Texas